Clarence Tilghman Drayer (August 29, 1901 – October 8, 1977) was an American football player. He played college football for the University of Illinois and in the National Football League (NFL) for the Dayton Triangles in 1925. He appeared in four NFL games. He later operated a stone-contracting firm from 1926 to 1948. He was also the unsuccessful Republican candidate in the 1963 Indianapolis mayoral election.

References

1901 births
1977 deaths
Dayton Triangles players
Illinois Fighting Illini football players
Players of American football from Ohio